The Nebraska Intercollegiate Athletic Association (NIAA) was an intercollegiate athletic conference that existed from 1928 to 1942. The league comprised public state colleges in the state of Nebraska. After the NIAA folded in 1942, most of the league's members re-joined the Nebraska College Conference.

Football champions

1928 – 
1929 –  and 
1930 – 
1931 – 
1932 – 

1933 – 
1934 – 
1935 – 
1936 – 
1937 – 

1938 – 
1939 – 
1940 – 
1941 – 
1942 –

See also
 List of defunct college football conferences

References

 
College sports in Nebraska